The men's pole vault event  at the 1985 European Athletics Indoor Championships was held on 3 March.

Results

References

Pole vault at the European Athletics Indoor Championships
Pole